The Australian Army Band Corps (AABC) is the Australian Army's musical branch. It is roughly the equivalent of the Music Branch (Canadian Forces) and the Royal Corps of Army Music of the British Army. The Corps was formed on 2 August 1968 and provides the Army with musical support and seeks to improve the Army's public image. It consists of 11 individual bands; five full-time and six part-time which are located in the capital city of each state as well as the regional cities of Wagga Wagga, Townsville, and Newcastle.

The band’s mission is to support land operations and strategy through military and community engagement.

History
After World War II there was a need to make an assessment of the state of Army Bands. In 1951, Captain R.A. Newman was appointed the first Director of Music and in 1953 an Army School of Music was established to provide standardized formal training for Army musicians. Until 1961, Newman held the concurrent roles of Director of Music and Commanding Officer of the Army School of Music. In the 1960s focus centered on the conversion from brass band to military band instrumentation. First with the Band of the Royal Military College in 1964, all Regular Army bands were converted to this new format  by 1974. Prior to the formation of the (AABC), Army musicians were held on the Royal Australian Infantry Corps Special List. It was the ambition of senior band personnel to have the specialization of music recognized by the creation of a corps. This goal was realized on 2 August 1968 with the establishment of the AABC, the first of its type in the world. After the creation of the AABC, bands previously belonging to infantry battalions were reassigned to become area bands and were affiliated with particular host corps.

Three of the now former bands were recognized by the granting of Freedom of Entry to their units:

1MD Band (AAB Brisbane) – City of Brisbane in 1988
1MD Band (AAB Brisbane) – City of Gold Coast in 1989
1MD Band (AAB Brisbane) – Shire of Redland in 1989

Composition
 Headquarters 
 Australian Army Band Tasmania
 Australian Army Band Sydney
 Band of the 1st Battalion, Royal Australian Regiment
 Band of the Royal Military College
 Australian Army Band Perth
 Australian Army Band Newcastle
 Band of the 1st Brigade (formerly Australian Army Band Darwin)
 Australian Army Band Brisbane
 Australian Army Band Kapooka
 Australian Army Band Melbourne
 Australian Army Band Adelaide

Former bands in the Army
Historical military bands in the AABC include:

 Army School of Music (ASM)
 Band of the 3rd Battalion, Royal Australian Regiment
 Band of the 5th Battalion, Royal Australian Regiment
 Southern Command Band
 Eastern Command Band
 Northern Command Band
 Central Command Band
 Western Command Band
 Tasmanian Command Band
 Band of the Royal Australian Artillery
 Band of the Royal Australian Engineers 
 Band of the Royal Australian Corps of Signals
 Band of the Royal Australian Armoured Corps
 Australian Army Band Singapore
 1st Recruit Training Battalion Band
 North Queensland Army Band 
 1st Military District Band 
 2nd Military District Band 
 3rd Military District Band
 4th Military District Band
 5th Military District Band
 6th Military District Band
 7th Military District Band
 Band of the 1st Regiment, Royal Australian Artillery

AABC Association
The AABC Association originated from an idea expressed at the  opening of the J.J. Shelton Band Centre at the Army Recruit Training Centre in March 1987.  The association organized its first meeting on 10 June 1989, during which it was formally established. Since then the association has held reunions throughout Australia every year, growing to be an organization parallel to the Returned and Services League of Australia.

The goals of the association include the following:

The communication between all former members of Army bands through personal contact and annual reunions 
To foster the development of relations between former and current serving members of the AAVC.
To support the activities of the AABC

The AABC Association was incorporated in Victoria on 5 October 2004. The association is led by an Executive Committee which is composed of a President, a Vice President and a Secretary.

Gallery

See also
Army Recruit Training Centre
Defence Force School of Music
The Lancer Band
RVR Pipes and Drums Association
Australia's Federation Guard

References

External links

Australian Army Band Corps
About the Australian Army Band

Military units and formations established in 1968
Band
Australian military bands
Musical groups established in 1968
1968 establishments in Australia